Tetrachyron is a genus of Mesoamerican plants in the tribe Heliantheae within the family Asteraceae.

 Species
 Tetrachyron brandegeei (Greenm.) Wussow & Urbatsch - Oaxaca, Puebla
 Tetrachyron discolor (A.Gray) Wussow & Urbatsch - Hidalgo
 Tetrachyron grayi (Klatt) Wussow & Urbatsch - Tamaulipas, Nuevo León
 Tetrachyron manicatum Schltdl. - Oaxaca, Veracruz
 Tetrachyron orizabaensis (Klatt) Wussow & Urbatsch - Guatemala, Chiapas, Oaxaca, Puebla, Veracruz
 Tetrachyron torresii B.L.Turner - Oaxaca
 Tetrachyron websteri (Wussow & Urbatsch) B.L.Turner - Tamaulipas, Hidalgo, Querétaro

 formerly included
see Calea 
 Tetrachyron oaxacana - Calea oaxacana

References

Asteraceae genera
Flora of North America
Heliantheae